{{routemap
|title=Route map
|title bg = #
|title color = white
|collapse = yes
|map = 
\\\\\~~Upper numbers are actual distance, lower are fare distance
\\hBHFq!~HUBa\hSTRq~~ ~~ ~~Osaka Monorail Main Line
\\tKBHFa!~HUBe\~~0.0~~T11 
KDSTaq\tSTRaq\tABZg+r\~~Dainichi Depot
\\tBHF\~~1.8~~T12 
\\tKRZto\tBHFq!~HUBa~~ ~~ ~~
\\tBHF!~HUBaq\HUBrf~~3.0~~T13 ~~I14
\\tBHF\~~4.0~~T14 
\\tBHF\~~5.1~~T15 
\\tBHF\~~5.9~~T16 
\\tBHF\~~7.2~~T17 
\\HUBrg\tBHF!~HUBq\HUBlg\~~8.5~~T18 ~~K11
\\htSTRaq!~HUB\tKRZtu\tBHFq!~HUBe\tSTR+r~~ ~~ ~~←Hankyu Senri Line
\\uexKBHFa!~HUBe\tSTR\\tLSTR~~ ~~ ~~
\\uexSTRr\tSTR\\~~ ~~ ~~Hanshin Kita-Osaka Line
\\tBHF\~~9.3~~T19 
hBHFq\hABZqr\tKRZh\~~ ~~ ~~ (Osaka Loop Line)
\\tBHF\~~10.3~~T20 ~~(connections below)
\\tSTR+r\tSTR\\~~ ~~ ~~JR Tōzai Line
\\tKRZtu\tKRZtu\tBHFq!~HUBa\tSTRr~~ ~~ ~~
\\tBHF!~HUBaq\tBHF!~HUBq\HUBrf\~~11.5~~T21 ~~K13
\\tSTRl\tKRZto\tSTRq\~~ ~~ ~~L： 
tSTR+r\\tSTR\~~ ~~ ~~Keihan Nakanoshima Line
tKRZW\WASSERq\tKRZW\WASSERq~~ ~~ ~~old Yodo River
tABZql\tBHFq!~HUBa\tKRZtu\tSTReq~~ ~~ ~~Keihan Main Line
\HUBlf\tBHF!~HUBeq\~~~~T22 
\\tBHF!~HUBaq\HUBlg~~~~T23 ~~C18
\\\tKRZtu\tBHFq!~tkSTRc2!~HUBe\tkABZq+3~~ ~~ ~~
\\tSTR\tkSTR+1
\\tKRWgl\tKRWg+r
\\tSTR\tENDEe
\\tKRZto\tBHFq!~HUBa~~ ~~ ~~ Nagahori Tsurumi-ryokuchi Line
\\tBHF!~HUBaq\HUBrf~~~~T24 ~~N18
\\tBHF!~HUBaq\HUBlg~~~~T25 ~~S18
\\\tKRZto\tBHFq!~HUBe\tSTRq~~ ~~ ~~
\\\\tKRZto\tBHFq!~HUBa\htSTReq\hABZq+l~~ ~~ ~~←Kintetsu Namba Line / Osaka Line→
\\\\tSTR\KBHFaq!~HUBe\hSTRaq\hSTRr~~ ~~ ~~
\\tSTR\
\\tBHF\~~~~T26 
\\tSTR\~~ ~~ ~~Osaka Loop Line
\\\\tBHF!~HUBaq\HUBlg\\STR+1~~~~T27 ~~(M23)
\\\\tKRZ\BHFq!~HUB\STRq\ABZqr+r~~ ~~ ~~Kansai Main Line (Yamatoji Line)
\\\\etKRZ\exKBHFeq!~HUB\\hSTRa~~ ~~ ~~Nankai: Tennoji Line
\\\\tKRZtu\tBHFq!~HUBe\tSTR+r\hSTR~~ ~~ ~~
\\\\tSTR\hKBHFaq\tKRZh\hKRZhu~~ ~~ ~~
\\\\tSTR\\tSTR\hSTR~~ ~~ ~~Minami Osaka Line→
\\\\tSTR\uKBHFa\tSTR\hLSTR~~ ~~ ~~Tennōji-ekimae
\\\\tSTR\uSTR\tSTR\hLSTR~~ ~~ ~~Hanwa Line
\\\tBHF!~HUBaq\uBHF!~HUBeq\tSTR~~~~T28 
\\\emtKRZ\ueABZg+r\tSTR~~ ~~ ~~Nankai Hirano Line
\\\mtKRZ\uxABZgr\tSTR~~ ~~ ~~Hankai Uemachi Line
\\\tKRZtu\uxmKRZt\tSTRr~~ ~~ ~~
\\\\tBHF\uexLSTR\\hLSTR~~~~T29 
\\\\tKRZh\uxmKRZh\hSTRq\hSTRr~~ ~~ ~~Hanwa Line
\\tBHF\uexLSTR~~~~T30 
\\tKRZh\uxmKRZh~~ ~~ ~~Kintetsu: Minami-Osaka Line
\\tBHF\uexLSTR~~~~T31 
\\\tSTR\uexSTRl\uexKBHFeq~~ ~~ ~~Hirano (Nankai)
\\tBHF\~~~~T32 
\\tBHF\~~~~T33 
\\etKRZ\~~ ~~ ~~Kansai Line Branch (Hanwa Freight Line)
\\tBHF\~~~~T34 
\\tBHF\~~~~T35 
\\\tSTRe\\
\\\KRWgl\KRW+r\
\\KBHFe\STR~~~~T36 
\\\\KDSTe\~~Yao Depot~~
}}

The  is a rapid transit line of Osaka Metro, running from Dainichi Station in Moriguchi to Yaominami Station in Yao through Osaka. On line maps, stations on the Tanimachi Line are indicated with the letter T.

The central part of the line runs underneath Tanimachi-suji, a broad north–south thoroughfare lined with prefectural government buildings and Buddhist temples. Its only above-ground segment is the vicinity of Yaominami Station.

Overview 
As noted above, the Tanimachi Line is officially "Line No. 2", but it was actually the fourth to open, after Line No. 3 (the Yotsubashi Line) during World War II and Line No. 4 (the Chūō Line) in the early 1960s. The line was opened gradually from the late 1960s to the early 1980s.

Ridership, though less than half the numbers of the Midōsuji Line, is still the second-highest of all lines in the Osaka subway network, thanks to the large number of government buildings in eastern Chūō-ku and schools around Tennōji (total ridership for fiscal year 2009 was approximately 480,000 per day). It is also the second-most profitable subway line in Osaka (total profit for FY 2009 was ¥7.3 billion — a 9.4% increase over the previous year).

The Tanimachi Line has the longest operating distance (for the purpose of fare calculation) in the Osaka subway network, after the Midōsuji Line (although the latter would be the longest in the Osaka subway network if the Kita-Osaka Kyūkō Railway section of the Midōsuji Line was taken into account). It runs completely underground from Dainichi to just before Yaominami, and was known as the longest continuously underground subway line in Japan for a long time after the opening of Yaominami Station (it was also among the longest subway tunnels in the world at the time of its opening). Now, it is fourth in Japan after the Toei Ōedo Line (entire line), Saitama Rapid Railway Line/Tokyo Metro Namboku Line/Tōkyū Meguro Line ( –  via  and), and Nagoya Municipal Subway Meijō Line/Meikō Line (entire line).

(By comparison, the Chūō Line is the only subway line in Osaka that connects to all other subway lines, as well as the Nankō Port Town Line.)

Line data 
 Above-ground section: vicinity of Yaominami
 Blocking system: Automatic
 Train protection system: WS-ATC
 Cars per train: 6 (1976–present)
 Maximum possible cars per train (platform length): 8

For the purposes of fare calculation, the Higashi-Umeda–Tennōji segment is adjusted to the same length as Umeda–Tennōji on the Midōsuji Line.

Stations

Stopping patterns 
All trains stop at every station along their route. During the day, trains alternate between Dainichi and Yaominami, and between Miyakojima and Fuminosato, with additional trains starting or terminating at Kire-Uriwari during rush hour. As the line is quite long and goes through the center of Osaka, express service was planned, but never implemented.

Since 1976, all trains have had 6 cars. Platforms are long enough to accommodate 8-car trainsets; the unused portions are fenced.

Women-only cars
Women-only cars were introduced on the line from 15 December 2003. There is one such designated car in each train (Car No. 3), the use of which is restricted on weekdays from the first train until 9 a.m. The women-only restriction is lifted after 9 a.m.

Rolling stock 

 22 series 6-car EMUs (since 1990)
 30000 series 6-car EMUs (since 2009)

Train maintenance and inspection is carried out by the same group in charge of Chūō Line trains, at the Morinomiya depot and workshop, accessible through a spur located before Tanimachi Rokuchōme Station on the Tanimachi Line and after Tanimachi Yonchōme Station on the Chūō Line (the Dainichi and Yao depots are used mainly to store off-service trains). In 2006, in preparation for the opening of the Kintetsu Keihanna Line extension of the Chūō Line (then known as the Higashi-Osaka Line), nine 20-series trainsets of the Tanimachi Line were exchanged for nine 22-series trainsets (converted from 24-series trains) from the Chūō Line.

Former
 50 series (1969–1991)
 5700 series (1980–1991)
 5800 series (1978–1991)
 5900 series (1978–1991)
 10 series (1974–1976) (subsequently transferred to the Midōsuji Line)
 20 series (1989–2006) (transferred to the Chūō Line)
 30 series (1967–2013)

History

Construction
According to the original plan laid out for the Tanimachi Line in 1927, it was to follow Matsuyamachi-suji (to the west of Tanimachi-suji). A second tunnel was dug at Umeda for this purpose, but the connection southwards was plagued by collapses and other accidents; as a result, the planned route was changed to the current one, stopping at Higashi-Umeda and then veering eastward. The tunnel at Umeda reserved for the Tanimachi Line ("Matsuyamachi Line") went unused for decades before finally being adapted for the southbound track of the Midōsuji Line in 1989, allowing for expanded platforms to cope with overcrowding.

Over the course of tunnel construction for the line, the underground waterways in Osaka were greatly altered, causing a number of incidents in which famous wells dried up.

In 1970, during the construction of the underground Tenjimbashi Rokuchōme Station, there was a large gas explosion which caused a number of workers' deaths. This became known as the "Ten-Roku Gas Explosion Accident" in Japan.

Successor to the Nankai Hirano Line 
Compared to the majority of areas served by the subway, where it runs underneath major roadways with high levels of traffic, part of the Tanimachi Line runs underneath relatively narrow streets with fewer cars, near residential areas. This is because the Abeno–Hirano section of the line was constructed as the successor in passenger transport to the same section of the Nankai Hirano Line, a tramway which ran aboveground between Imaike and Hirano, following the route of the Tanimachi Line from Abeno eastward. While it belongs to a different operator, this section of the Tanimachi Line is essentially the old streetcar line converted to an underground rapid-transit service.

The names of stations within this section reflect the station names of the Hirano Line:

Timeline 
24 March 1967: Opening of the Higashi-Umeda – Tanimachi Yonchōme section as Osaka Subway Line 2. Trains started running in 2-car formation.
October, 1967: Automatic train operation (ATO) trialled on Line 2, trials ended in February 1968.
17 December 1968: Opening of the Tanimachi Yōnchōme – Tennōji section. Trains started running in 4-car formation.
6 December 1969: Officially adopted the name Tanimachi Line.
8 April 1970: The "Ten-Roku Gas Explosion Accident" occurs during the construction of the underground Tenjimbashi Rokuchōme Station at 17:45 JST, leading to 79 deaths and 420 injuries.
29 May 1974: Opening of the Higashi-Umeda – Miyakojima section. 10 series EMUs began operation (later transferred to Midōsuji Line in February 1976).
25–31 October 1976: Trains started running in 6-car formation.
6 April 1977: Opening of the Miyakojima – Moriguchi section.
27 November 1980: Opening of the Tennōji – Yaominami section.
8 February 1983: Opening of the Moriguchi – Dainichi section.
May 1989: 20 series EMUs began operation (transferred to the Chūō Line in 2006)
April 1990: 22 series EMUs began operation, replacing the 50 series.
18 March 2009: 30000 series EMUs began operation.

References

Osaka Metro
Rail transport in Osaka Prefecture
Standard gauge railways in Japan
Railway lines opened in 1967
750 V DC railway electrification
1967 establishments in Japan